Franck Mbella Thierry Etouga (born 18 September 2001) is a Cameroonian association football player who plays as a forward for Egyptian club Al Masry. Etouga previously played for Nkufo Academy before joining Fortuna de Mfou and Ghanaian club Kumasi Asante Kotoko.

Within a season of joining Asante Kotoko he is regarded as one of the most prolific attackers in the Ghana Premier League.

Club career 
Etouga started his career with Nkufo Academy, an academy owned by Swiss international of African descent Blaise Nkufo. At the academy Etouga scored 61 goals and provided 13 assists in 30 games. He went on to join Fortuna de Mfou in 2020. At Fortuna, he scored eight goals and assisted nine in 21 matches as the club placed third in the Cameroon Elite One League helping the club to a third-place finish. In the third place playoff match, Etouga inspired Fortuna to a 5–0 victory over Fovu Club de Baham by scoring two goals and providing an assist.

On 12 October 2021, Etouga signed for Asante Kotoko on a three-year deal and was to join the club in Dubai who were in a pre-season tour in UAE. Prior to his signing Kotoko had signed his compatriot Georges Mfegue making him the second Cameroonian to join the club in two days. He made his debut for the Porcupine warriors on 28 November 2021 coming on the 90th minute to make a cameo debut in a goalless draw against Karela United. On 15 December 2021, on his full debut for the club and scored his debut goal in the 49th minute of an eventual 1–1 draw against Real Tamale United. In the next match against Legon Cities, he scored a brace including scoring the winning goal to grant Kotoko a 2–1 victory. On 9 January 2022, Etouga scored a second half hat-trick in the Ashanti derby against Obuasi-based club Ashanti Gold.

Etouga scored his second hat-trick of the season on 12 February 2022 scoring all three goals in a 3–1 victory over Accra Lions. As at February 2022, he was leading the top goal scorer's chart and had reportedly become a transfer target for several clubs in France and Turkey.

International career 
Etouga was a member of the Cameroon U-20 national team in 2020. He was named in the team's squad list for the UNIFFAC U-20 Nations Cup which also serves as qualifiers for the 2021 Africa U-20 Cup of Nations. He scored one goal in their 3–1 victory over Congo. Cameroon won the competition and qualified for the Africa U-20 Cup of Nations. He however missed out on the squad for the 2021 Africa U-20 Cup of Nations.

Honours 
Asante Kotoko

 Ghana Premier League: 2021–22

Cameroon U-20

 UNIFFAC U-20 Nations Cup: 2020

Individual

 VAR Player of the Month: March 2021
 Ghana Premier League Player of the month: January 2022
 Ghana Premier League Most Outstanding Player of the season: 2021–22

References

External links 

 

Living people
2001 births
Cameroonian footballers
Association football forwards
Cameroon youth international footballers
Asante Kotoko S.C. players
Cameroonian expatriate footballers
Cameroonian expatriate sportspeople in Ghana
Expatriate footballers in Ghana
Ghana Premier League players